Kiril Stoychev Terziev (born 1 September 1983, in Petrich) is a Bulgarian freestyle wrestler. He won a bronze medal at the 2008 Summer Olympics in Beijing in his category (up to 74 kg).

He is a representative for Bulgarian company TRYMAX.

References

 

Living people
1983 births
Olympic wrestlers of Bulgaria
Wrestlers at the 2008 Summer Olympics
Wrestlers at the 2012 Summer Olympics
Olympic bronze medalists for Bulgaria
People from Petrich
Olympic medalists in wrestling
Macedonian Bulgarians
Medalists at the 2008 Summer Olympics
Wrestlers at the 2015 European Games
European Games competitors for Bulgaria
Bulgarian male sport wrestlers
Sportspeople from Blagoevgrad Province
20th-century Bulgarian people
21st-century Bulgarian people